Dominik Mašek (born 10 July 1995) is a professional Czech football player, who last played as a winger for Jablonec in the Czech First League.

Career
He made his league debut on 28 May 2011 (age 15 years 322 days) and became the youngest ever Czech First League player, a record he holds to this day.

References

External links 

National Team profile

1995 births
Living people
Czech footballers
Czech expatriate footballers
Czech Republic youth international footballers
Czech First League players
Eredivisie players
Regionalliga players
1. FK Příbram players
Hamburger SV II players
SC Cambuur players
Bohemians 1905 players
FK Mladá Boleslav players
FC Fastav Zlín players
Sportspeople from Příbram
Association football forwards
Czech expatriate sportspeople in Germany
Czech expatriate sportspeople in the Netherlands
Expatriate footballers in Germany
Expatriate footballers in the Netherlands
Czech Republic under-21 international footballers
FK Jablonec players